This is a list of lists of cities in Europe. Lists of countries includes countries that fall to at least some extent within European geographical boundaries according to certain definitions.

European Union
 List of cities in the European Union by population within city limits
 List of urban areas in the European Union
 List of European Union cities proper by population density

Sovereign states

 List of cities in Albania
 List of cities and towns in Andorra
 List of cities and towns in Armenia
 List of cities and towns in Austria
 List of cities in Azerbaijan
 List of cities and towns in Belarus
 List of cities in Belgium
 List of cities in Bosnia and Herzegovina
 List of cities and towns in Bulgaria
 List of cities in Croatia
 List of cities, towns and villages in Cyprus
 List of cities and towns in the Czech Republic
 List of cities in Denmark
 List of cities and towns in Estonia
 List of cities and towns in Finland
 List of communes in France
 List of cities in Georgia
 List of cities and towns in Germany
 List of cities in Greece
 List of cities and towns in Hungary
 List of cities and towns in Iceland
 List of cities in Ireland
 List of cities in Italy
 List of cities in Kosovo
 List of cities and towns in Latvia
 List of municipalities in Liechtenstein
 List of cities in Lithuania
 List of towns in Luxembourg
 List of cities in Malta (historical only)
 List of cities and towns in Moldova
 Monaco (city-state)
 List of cities in Montenegro
 List of cities in the Netherlands
 List of cities in North Macedonia
 List of towns and cities in Norway
 List of cities and towns in Poland
 List of cities in Portugal
 List of cities and towns in Romania
 List of cities and towns in Russia
 List of municipalities of San Marino
 List of cities in Serbia
 List of cities and towns in Slovakia
 List of cities and towns in Slovenia
 List of municipalities of Spain
 List of cities in Sweden
 List of cities in Switzerland
 List of cities in Turkey
 List of cities in Ukraine
 List of cities in the United Kingdom

Dependencies, autonomies, other territories
 Gibraltar (city territory)
 List of places in the Isle of Man
 Towns of the Faroe Islands
 Guernsey
 Jersey

See also
 Cities of present-day nations and states
 Europe
 List of cities by continent
 List of cities in Africa
 List of cities in Asia
 List of cities in North America
 List of cities in Oceania
 List of cities in South America
 List of villages in Europe by country
 Lists of cities
 
 

Lists of cities by continent